The College of Medicine (CoM) is a United Kingdom-based organisation founded in October 2010 that grew out of The Prince's Foundation for Integrated Health after it was shut down due to accounting fraud. It is chaired by Michael Dixon, a former director of the Foundation. It promotes alternative medicine.

Former director George Lewith was a council member of the Foundation - his research unit at the University of Southampton played an important role in the development of the foundation.

When the College of Medicine was launched, several commentators writing in the Guardian and the BMJ, expressed the opinion that the new organisation was simply a re-branding of the Prince's Foundation, some describing it as "Hamlet without the Prince".

References

External links
 

2010 establishments in the United Kingdom
Alternative medicine organizations
Medical and health organisations based in the United Kingdom